The men's marathon at the 1932 Summer Olympics took place on August 7. It started and finished at the Los Angeles Memorial Coliseum. Twenty-eight athletes from 14 nations competed. The 1930 Olympic Congress in Berlin had reduced the limit from 6 athletes per NOC to 3 athletes. The event was won by Juan Carlos Zabala of Argentina, the nation's first Olympic marathon medal. Great Britain also earned its first Olympic marathon medal with Sam Ferris's silver, while Finland made the marathon podium for a fourth consecutive Games as Armas Toivonen won bronze.

Background
This was the ninth appearance of the event, which is one of 12 athletics events to have been held at every Summer Olympics. Returning runners from 1928 included sixth-place finisher Seiichiro Tsuda of Japan, eighth-place finisher Sam Ferris of Great Britain, ninth-place finisher Albert Michelsen of the United States, and tenth-place finisher Clifford Bricker of Canada. Ferris, along with Dunky Wright (20th in 1928) were among the best-known runners who competed; Armas Toivonen led the always-strong Finnish team. Finland was without Paavo Nurmi, who would have been favored but was suspended just days before the Games began for allegedly accepting excessive expense money in violation of amateurism rules. Finns charged that the Swedish officials, who were in charge of the international athletics federation at the time, had used devious tricks in their campaign against Nurmi's amateur status, and ceased all athletic relations with Sweden.

Argentina, Brazil, and Colombia each made their first appearance in Olympic marathons. The United States made its ninth appearance, the only nation to have competed in each Olympic marathon to that point.

Competition format
As all Olympic marathons, the competition was a single race. The now-standard marathon distance of 26 miles, 385 yards was run over a course that "started and finished at the Los Angeles Memorial Coliseum, but was a loop course around Los Angeles."

Records
Prior to this competition, the existing world and Olympic records were as follows.

(*) Course was list at 42.75 kilometres.

Schedule

Results

References

Athletics at the 1932 Summer Olympics
Marathons at the Olympics
Men's marathons
Men's events at the 1932 Summer Olympics